Víctor Blasco (born 1 July 1994) is a Spanish footballer who plays as a midfielder for a Cambodian top-flight club, Preah Khan Reach Svay Rieng FC.

Career

Early career
Born in Barcelona, Catalonia, Blasco spent his youth career with Barcelona, Cornellà and Mallorca before moving to Canada to play university football at Vancouver Island University. In the 2014 season with the Mariners, he led the PACWEST with 12 goals in 13 appearances and was named 2014 PACWEST Rookie of the Year and Player of the Year.

Whitecaps FC 2
On 25 March 2015, Blasco signed a professional contract with USL expansion club Whitecaps FC 2.  He made his professional debut on 29 March in a 4–0 defeat to Seattle Sounders FC 2. Blasco was released by Vancouver on 19 April 2016 for an undisclosed breach of club policy.

Pacific FC
After returning to VIU, and playing in the PCSL and the VMSL, Blasco signed with new club Pacific FC of the Canadian Premier League on 7 February 2019. In 25 games, Blasco scored six goals and three assists in the 2019 Canadian Premier League season, which was also the first season in league history, and also appeared in one Canadian Championship match. Pacific finished in fifth in the spring season and fourth in the fall season, not qualifying for the finals. After Blasco's successful 2021 season, where Pacific captured the championship, he departed the club.

Vida
On 16 December 2021, Blasco signed with Honduran Liga Nacional club Vida.

Preah Khan Reach Svay Rieng FC
On 10 June 2022, it was announced that Blasco signed with Preah Khan Reach Svay Rieng FC who's playing in Cambodian Premier League. He joins his former teammate at Pacific FC Marcus Haber

Honours
Individual
CCAA All-Canadian: 2014
PACWEST 1st-Team All Star: 2014
PACWEST Rookie of the Year: 2014
PACWEST Player of the Year: 2014
Pacific FC
Canadian Premier League: 2021

References

External links
 Canadian Premier league profile page

1994 births
Living people
Association football midfielders
Spanish footballers
Footballers from Barcelona
Spanish expatriate footballers
Expatriate soccer players in Canada
Spanish expatriate sportspeople in Canada
Expatriate footballers in Honduras
Spanish expatriate sportspeople in Honduras
Whitecaps FC 2 players
Pacific FC players
C.D.S. Vida players
USL Championship players
Canadian Premier League players
Vancouver Island University alumni
University and college soccer players in Canada